Sangli-ye Shirin (also Romanized as Sanglī-ye Shīrīn; also known as Sīnglī-ye Shīrīn, Sengeli, Sīnkelī-ye Shīrīn, and Sanglī) is a village in Faruj Rural District, in the Central District of Faruj County, North Khorasan Province, Iran. At the 2006 census, its population was 233, in 54 families.

References 

Populated places in Faruj County